Hypoglycin B is a naturally occurring organic compound in the species Blighia sapida. It is particularly concentrated in the fruit of the plant especially in the seeds. Hypoglycin B is toxic if ingested and is one of the causative agents of Jamaican vomiting sickness. It is a dipeptide of glutamic acid and hypoglycin A.

References

Dipeptides
Dicarboxylic acids
Toxic amino acids